Shuma may refer to:
Shuma, Iran, a village in Mazandaran Province
Shuma-Gorath, a fictional character
Kia Shuma, a car by Kia Motors
Schutzmannschaft, auxiliary police from locals in Nazi-occupied countries
Ogata Shuma, character from Japanese folklore